Józef Adam Zygmunt Cyrankiewicz (23 April 1911 – 20 January 1989) was a Polish Socialist (PPS) and after 1948 Communist politician. He served as premier of the Polish People's Republic between 1947 and 1952, and again for 16 years between 1954 and 1970. He also served as Chairman of the Polish Council of State from 1970 to 1972.

Early life 
Cyrankiewicz was born in Tarnów in what was then the Austro-Hungarian Empire, to father Józef (1881-1939) and mother Regina née Szpak (1880-1966). His father was a local activist of the National Democracy as well as lieutenant in the Polish Armed Forces while his mother was an owner of several sawmills. Cyrankiewicz attended the Jagiellonian University. He became secretary of the Kraków branch of the Polish Socialist Party in 1935.

World War II
Active in the Union of Armed Struggle (Związek Walki Zbrojnej, later renamed to Armia Krajowa), the Polish resistance organisation, from the beginning of Poland's 1939 defeat at the start of World War II, Cyrankiewicz was captured by the Gestapo in the spring of 1941 and after imprisonment at Montelupich was sent to the Auschwitz concentration camp. He arrived on 4 September 1942, and received registration number 62,933.

He, along with other Auschwitz prisoners, was eventually transferred to Mauthausen as the Soviet front line approached Auschwitz late in the war. He was eventually liberated by the US Army.

The Auschwitz controversy 
According to post-war communist era-propaganda, while in Auschwitz, Cyrankiewicz attempted to organize a resistance movement among the other imprisoned socialists and also worked on bringing the various international prisoners' groups together; those claims, used to build up his reputation in post-war Poland, are considered exaggerated by modern historians. Instead, modern historians note that Cyrankiewicz controversially not only refused an appeal of a death sentence by Witold Pilecki, a Home Army resistance fighter who infiltrated Auschwitz and is considered to be the main creator of the resistance there, but suggested that he be treated "harshly, as an enemy of the state".

Rise to power

First period in office 

Following the end of the war, he became secretary-general of the Polish Socialist Party's central executive committee in 1946. However, factional infighting split the Party into two camps: one led by Cyrankiewicz, the other by Edward Osóbka-Morawski, who was also prime minister.

Osóbka-Morawski thought the PPS should join with the other non-communist party in Poland, the Polish Peasant Party, to form a united front against communism. Cyrankiewicz argued that the PPS should support the communists (who held most of the posts in the government) in carrying through a socialist programme, while opposing the imposition of one party rule. The Communist Polish Workers' Party (PPR) played on this division within the PPS, dismissing Osóbka-Morawski and making Cyrankiewicz prime minister.

The PPS merged with the PPR in 1948 to form the Polish United Workers' Party (PZPR). Although the PZPR was the PPR under a new name, Cyrankiewicz remained as prime minister. He was also named a secretary of the PZPR Central Committee.

Cyrankiewicz gave up the prime minister's post in 1952 because party boss Bolesław Bierut wanted the post for himself. He did, however, become a deputy premier under Bierut.

Second period in office 
However, in 1954, after Poland returned to "collective leadership," Cyrankiewicz returned to the premiership, a post he would hold until 1970. By this time, there was little left of Cyrankiewicz the socialist, as evidenced during the 1956 upheaval following Nikita Khrushchev's "secret speech."  He tried to repress the rioting that erupted across the country at first, threatening that "any provocateur or lunatic who raises his hand against the people's government may be sure that this hand will be chopped off."

Cyrankiewicz was also responsible for the order to fire on the protesters during the 1970 demonstrations on the coast in which 42 people were killed and more than a 1,000 wounded.  A few months after these demonstrations, Cyrankiewicz turned over the premiership to his longtime deputy, Piotr Jaroszewicz, and was named chairman of the Council of State—a post equivalent to that of president. Although it was nominally the highest state post in Poland, Cyrankiewicz had gone into semi-retirement. He held this post until he formally retired in 1972.

Cyrankiewicz died in 1989, a few months before the collapse of the communist regime. However, Cyrankiewicz (with others involved in the 1948 show trial) was posthumously charged in 2003 with complicity in Witold Pilecki's judicial murder.

Honors
:
 Order of the Builders of People's Poland 
 Grand Cross of the Order of Polonia Restituta 
 Order of the Banner of Work (1st class)
 Order of the Cross of Grunwald (2nd class)
 Partisan Cross

Other countries:
 Grand Cross of the Legion of Honour (France)
 Knight Grand Cross with Collar of the Order of Merit of the Italian Republic (Italy)
 Jubilee Medal "In Commemoration of the 100th Anniversary of the Birth of Vladimir Ilyich Lenin" (Soviet Union)

See also
 History of Poland (1945-1989)
 List of honorary citizens of Skopje

References 

1911 births
1989 deaths
Politicians from Tarnów
People from the Kingdom of Galicia and Lodomeria
Polish Austro-Hungarians
Polish Socialist Party politicians
Members of the Politburo of the Polish United Workers' Party
Heads of state of the Polish People's Republic
Prime Ministers of the Polish People's Republic
Members of the Polish Sejm 1947–1952
Members of the Polish Sejm 1952–1956
Members of the Polish Sejm 1961–1965
Members of the Polish Sejm 1965–1969
Members of the Polish Sejm 1969–1972
Jagiellonian University alumni
Auschwitz concentration camp survivors
Mauthausen concentration camp survivors
Recipients of the Order of the Builders of People's Poland
Recipients of the Order of the Cross of Grunwald, 2nd class
Recipients of the Order of the Banner of Work
Grand Crosses of the Order of Polonia Restituta
Grand Officiers of the Légion d'honneur
Knights Grand Cross of the Order of Merit of the Italian Republic